Vilamoura Old Course is a golf course in Vilamoura, on the Algarve in Southern Portugal. Sometimes referred to as the "Grande Dame" of the Algarve, it is owned and operated by Dom Pedro Hotels & Golf Collection, who purchased the course, along with four others in Vilamoura, in 2016. The five courses had previously been owned by the Oceanico Group since 2007.

Designed by Frank Pennink, the Old Course opened in 1969, and hosted the Portuguese Open in 1976. Following remodelling by Martin Hawtree, the course reopened in 1997.

Scorecard

See also
 List of golf courses in Portugal

References

External links

Golf clubs and courses in Portugal
Buildings and structures in the Algarve
Sports venues completed in 1969